Little Valley is an unincorporated community and census-designated place in Lassen County, California, United States. Its population is 84 as of the 2020 census.

Demographics

References

Unincorporated communities in California
Unincorporated communities in Lassen County, California
Census-designated places in California
Census-designated places in Lassen County, California